The Remembrance Drive is a rural road that links Camden and Aylmerton. The road served as the former alignment of Hume Highway from 1928 to 1984 and now forms part of the Old Hume Highway.

Route
The proper path taken by Remembrance Drive is from Camden South, Camden through the Razorback Range, passing through the towns of Picton, Tahmoor, Bargo and Yanderra and onwards to Aylmerton. In addition to the former alignment of the Hume Highway, it was also a part of the Remembrance Driveway that spans from Sydney to Canberra. After the Remembrance Driveway was realigned to the present Hume Highway and Hume Motorway alignment in late 1980s, the former route is designated as Remembrance Drive.

History
The driveway is historic, being a part of the original Great South Road, servicing the traffic between Sydney and Melbourne. The first road over the Razorback Range was cut in 1825 by convict gangs. The current route was cleared in 1830. Some sections of the route still use the concrete pavement laid in the 1920s and 1930s. The stretch along the Razorback Range is relatively steep. Between Picton and Bargo, the route passes through the town of Tahmoor instead of following an even older Hume Hwy route through Thirlmere, Hill Top and Colo Vale. It was redesignated as State Highway 89 after the alignment of Hume Highway changed.

The towns and settlements along the route are historic and a tourist attraction in their own right.

See also

 Highways in Australia
 List of highways in New South Wales
 Old Hume Highway

References

1830 establishments in Australia
Hume Highway